Clara Gardner Mairs (1878–1963) was an American painter and printmaker. Her prints were included in the publication Fine Prints of the Year during the 1930s.

Background and career 
Clara Gardner Mairs was born on January 5, 1878, in Hastings, Minnesota to Abigail and Samuel Mairs. Her grandfather, Stephen Gardner, built the first grain mill in Dakota County on the Vermillion River. Her father, Samuel Mairs, died in 1891 and Abigail moved a 13-year-old Clara and her three younger siblings, Sam, Helen, and Agnes to St. Paul, Minnesota. Clara attended the Mount Vernon Junior College and Seminary in Washington D.C. from 1895 to 1897. She also trained at the St. Paul School of art, a branch of the St Paul Institute. In the 1910s she attended the Pennsylvania Academy of Fine Arts and studied with impressionist landscape painter Daniel Garber.

Mairs returned to St. Paul by 1918 and supervised the Nimbus Club, an informal art group formed to allow artists to work from a live model. She was also instrumental in founding the Art League of St. Paul, which met in the then defunct St. Paul School of Art's auditorium. Through these groups, Mairs met a young artist named Clement Haupers. Though he was 22 years younger than her, the two would become lifelong companions. They held two-person exhibits at local art galleries and entered many of the same art shows.

In 1923, Mairs and Haupers traveled to Paris where they studied sculpture with Antoine Bourdelle at the Académie Colarossi and painting with André Lhote at the Académie Montparnasse. Mairs also briefly attended the Académie Julian. The pair toured Italy and spent a winter in Algiers before returning to Minnesota in 1925. They later frequented the Kettle River in Pine County, and created paintings of the people and landscape. Mairs then turned her artistic energy towards printmaking before she and Haupers returned to Paris in 1928. She began experimenting with etching techniques and was influenced by Jean Lurçat's gros point panels. Her visits to the zoo inspired tapestries depicting white gibbons and zebras. Beginning in Paris and influenced by her earlier work in textile design, Mairs created colorful five-by-six-foot wall hangings.

Mairs' print Leaping Leopards was reproduced in Fine Prints of the Year 1930. That same year her print Three Ring Circus earned an honorable mention at the Minneapolis Institute of Arts's Minneapolis and St. Paul Artists exhibition. Mairs' etchings were also included in Fine Prints of the Year in both 1932 and 1938. She was a member of the Minnesota Artists Association. She won awards at the Minnesota State Fair in 1925, 1926, 1931, 1933, 1936, and 1950.

Mairs' early works featured soft-ground etching, a process she often combined with aquatint. The etching process created textured masses and gave her lines a grainy quality.

Mairs died on May 24, 1963.

Notes

References

Further reading

External links 
 Clara Mairs in MNopedia, the Minnesota Encyclopedia

1878 births
1963 deaths
20th-century American painters
20th-century American printmakers
20th-century American women artists
Académie Colarossi alumni
American etchers
American women painters
American women printmakers
Modern painters
Painters from Minnesota
Pennsylvania Academy of the Fine Arts alumni
People from Hastings, Minnesota
Mount Vernon Seminary and College alumni
Women etchers
Artists from Minnesota